Auriga or AURIGA can refer to:

 Auriga (constellation), a constellation of stars
 Auriga (slave), a Roman charioteer
 HMS Auriga (P419), a British submarine launched in 1945
 Auriga of Delphi, name of the statue Charioteer of Delphi
 USM Auriga, a spaceship in the film Alien Resurrection
 Auriga, a fictional planet in the Endless franchise by Amplitude Studios
 AURIGA, a gravitational wave detector in Italy
 Auriga-1.2V (Аурига-1.2В), a Russian satellite communications system, and a component of the MK VTR-016 (МК ВТР-016) mobile video transmission system
, a number of steamships with this name